hit South Queensland is an Australian commercial radio station broadcasting to Southwest Queensland and the Darling Downs. Owned and operated by Southern Cross Austereo, the station broadcasts a contemporary hit radio music format with a local breakfast show based from studios in Toowoomba. Programming from Hit South Queensland is retransmitted in Charleville through 101.7 FM WEST FM (operated through Resonate Broadcasting)

History
The station was first launched in 2000 by RG Capital as C FM, affiliated with the Sea FM brand used by its sister stations on the Queensland coast. In 2004, C FM and sister station 4GR was sold to Macquarie Regional RadioWorks.

Following the merger of Southern Cross Media, Macquarie Regional RadioWorks' successor, with Austereo in February 2011, the Sea FM network - along with Hot FM and Star FM regional counterparts - became more closely aligned with the Today Network, including networking programming from 2DayFM Sydney and Fox FM Melbourne.

On 13 November 2013, C FM relaunched as Hot FM. As Hot FM, 4RGD performed well in a ratings survey conducted by Xtra Research in June 2016, winning an average of 31% audience share in all 10+ demographics. According to the survey results, the station also won all but two individual age demographics.  The station was beaten in the older 55-64 and 65+ demographics by ABC Southern Queensland.

On 15 December 2016, as part of a national brand consolidation by parent company Southern Cross Austereo, the station was merged into the Hit Network.

Transmitters
Hit South Queensland is broadcast via 3 full power stations.

In addition, the 3 full power stations feed a further 6 repeater stations (including 101.7 FM which is owned and operated by Resonate Broadcasting as WEST FM Charleville)

References 

Radio stations established in 2000
Radio stations in Queensland
Contemporary hit radio stations in Australia